The Meeting or "Bonjour, Monsieur Courbet" (French: La rencontre, ou "Bonjour Monsieur Courbet") is an oil on canvas painting by Gustave Courbet, made in 1854. It depicts the artist on his way to Montpellier meeting his patron Alfred Bruyas, his servant Calas and his dog. One of the most emblematic works by the artist, it is also one of his most popular. The composition is based on the myth of the Wandering Jew.

History and description
The painting was commissioned by Alfred Bruyas from Gustave Courbet. This work immortalizes the arrival of Gustave Courbet in Montpellier in 1854. It also represents the meeting of the painter with the one who will become his patron, Alfred Bruyas. The painting is inspired by a popular print engraved by Pierre Leloup du Mans in 1831, named The bourgeois of the city talking to the wandering Jew.   
The Meeting was exhibited in Paris at the 1855 Exhibition Universelle, where critics ridiculed it as "Bonjour, Monsieur Courbet". Bruyas did not exhibit The Meeting until he donated it to the Musée Fabre in Montpellier in 1868.

The work depicts the scene taking place in a road between Saint-Jean de Védas and Mireval, when Alfred Bruyas, patron collector, accompanied by his valet and his dog, comes to meet Courbet. Surprisingly, the artist represents himself on the same level as his protector. He even appears proud and robust while the latter is depicted as puny and stuffy.

References

External links
Courbet's Bonjour Monsieur Courbet, essay at Smarthistory

1854 paintings
Paintings by Gustave Courbet
Wandering Jew
Dogs in art
Paintings in the collection of the Musée Fabre